Yi Pochen (born October 24, 1996), known professionally as Ian Yi, is a Taiwanese actor, singer, rapper and dancer. He has been a member of the Taiwanese boyband SpeXial since 2015.

Biography 
Yi Pochen was born in Shilin District, Taipei on October 24, 1996. He has two younger siblings; a sister and a brother who is ten years younger. He attended Nan Chiang Industrial & Commercial Senior High School, where he graduated with a master's degree in performing arts. In the second half of 2014, after receiving two years of training, he joined the Taiwanese boy band SpeXial alongside two other new members. He debuted in SpeXial under the English name of "Ian" on January 13, 2015. In the group, he performs as a rapper and dancer. As the youngest member of the group, his fans nicknamed him "Little Star".

As an actor, he is best known for his roles in web series like Men with Sword, Stardom, K.O.3an Guo, Kai Feng Qi Tan,Well-Intended Love, and  Killer and Healer.

Filmography

Film

Television series

Discography

Awards and nominations

References

External links 
  Official web site

1996 births
Living people
Taiwanese male television actors
21st-century Taiwanese male actors
21st-century Taiwanese  male singers
Taiwanese pop singers
Taiwanese idols